Michel Bouvet (born 1955 in Tunis) is a French designer and poster artist. He is professor of visual culture at ESAG Penninghen (Paris).

Biography
Bouvet studied and graduated at École nationale supérieure des Beaux-Arts (ENSB-A).

His design influences include Fernand Léger, Raymond Savignac, André François and Roman Cieslewicz.

His posters are very often the result of a mixture of techniques (photography, collage, sculpture, painting), which gives them a highly poetic graphic dimension.

He has won many national and international design awards in Poland, Finland, Japan, China, Czech Republic

Since 2002, he designs the corporate identity for the Rencontres d'Arles.

He has been the curator of several international graphic design exhibitions.

He is a member of Alliance Graphique Internationale (AGI).

Honors and awards 
Lenica Prize, 18th International Poster Biennial in Warsaw, 2002
Alphonse Mucha Prize, 22nd Brno International Graphic Design Festival, 2006

Exhibitions 
1991: Long Live the Poster, Lalit Kala Akademi, National Academy of Art, New Delhi
1994: Third International Biennial of Poster in Mexico
1995: 38th DDD Gallery Exhibition (Japan)
2001: The 2nd International Poster Exhibition, Ningbo (China)
2005: Michel Bouvet Plakaty Posters, National Museum in Poznan, curated by Irena Przymus (Poland)
2008: Arrivage, affiches récentes de Michel Bouvet, Centre Culturel Français, Phnom Penh (Cambodia)
2009: 16th Biennial Colorado International Invitational Poster Exhibition
2010: Carteles de Michel Bouvet, Sala de exposiciones Riviera del Mar Salinas & Alliance Française, Quito (Ecuador)
2011: Manzana Uno, Santa Cruz de la Sierra (Bolivia)
2012: The Typo in All its Forms, Gobelins School of the Image (Paris)

Curator 
 2006: 9 Women in Graphic Design, Échirolles European Graphic Center (France)
 2008-2009: We Love Books: A World Tour, Échirolles European Graphic Center (France) with Philippe Di Folco, deputy curator

Conference and jury 
2005: CAFA Central Academy of Fine Arts (Beijing), China
2007: Taiwan International Poster Design Award
2008: Chicago International Poster Biennial Jury Exhibition
2009: The 9th International Poster Triennial in Toyama, Museum of Modern Art (Japan)
2010: Agidies International Design Week, Melbourne (Australia)
2010: Positive Posters International Annual Exhibition (Melbourne)

See also 
List of graphic designers
Graphic design

References 
Michel Bouvet (Vision of Design) by Jianping He, Page One
East-Coast West-Coast : The Graphic Designers in United States
Michel Bouvet by Gillian O'Meara & Alain Le Quernec

Notes

External links 
A Conversation with Michel Bouvet: La Lettre de la photographie
Michel Bouvet's Official Website

French poster artists
20th-century French painters
20th-century French male artists
French male painters
21st-century French painters
21st-century French male artists
French photographers
French typographers and type designers
French graphic designers
Art educators
1955 births
Living people